You Shoulda Told Me You Were... is a studio album by the American musical group Kid Creole and the Coconuts, released in 1991. It includes the single "(She's A) Party Girl".

Production
"Oh Marie" is about a woman shot during a drug-related drive-by. "Consequently" touches on the legacy of Christopher Columbus.

Critical reception

The Calgary Herald determined that "the love duet 'My Soul Intention' is like 'Wooly Bully' gone starry-eyed." The Sun Sentinel concluded that "Darnell has transformed himself from a sly, insightful lyricist to a sort of limp, Caribbean-flavored Prince."

The Globe and Mail wrote: "Wildly imaginative and cockily crafted, this is dance music for people who don't like dance music." The New York Times opined that "the temperament of American pop has narrowed, and it's hard to judge what room remains for the Kid Creole notion of a combined dance party and Broadway show."

The Morning Call included the album on its list of the 10 best of 1991, as did Geoffrey Himes of The Washington Post.

Track listing

References

Kid Creole and the Coconuts albums
1991 albums
Columbia Records albums